Microbulbifer marinus is a Gram-negative and strictly aerobic bacterium from the genus of Microbulbifer which has been isolated from the gastrointestinal tract of the sea urchin Heliocidaris crassispina from Dokdo in Korea.

References

External links
Type strain of Microbulbifer echini at BacDive -  the Bacterial Diversity Metadatabase

 

Alteromonadales
Bacteria described in 2017